Deadfall is a 1993 crime drama film directed by Christopher Coppola. Coppola co-wrote the script with Nick Vallelonga. The film stars Michael Biehn, Nicolas Cage, Sarah Trigger, Charlie Sheen, James Coburn, and Peter Fonda. It is also the prime influence on the song "Deadfall" written by the American hardcore punk band Snot. A prequel/sequel, Arsenal, starring Nicolas Cage as his character Eddie King, was released in 2017.

Plot

After con artist Joe Donan accidentally kills his father Mike during a sting when his blank bullets were replaced with live ammunition, he tries to carry out Mike's dying wish to recover "the cake". To do so he goes to find his uncle Lou. Uncle Lou, also a con artist, tries to get Joe in on one of his cons, but Joe falls in love with Lou's assistant's girlfriend Diane and decides that they will take the money from the con and run away. After the con goes wrong and Uncle Lou gets shot, Joe flees with the money but runs into his father, alive and well. Joe learns that Mike and Diane were working together to con Lou. Enraged, Joe fires his gun at Mike, not knowing whether the bullets inside were blanks or real. The bullet is a blank, and the film ends with Joe walking away from Mike.

Cast
 Michael Biehn as Joe Donan
 Sarah Trigger as Diane
 Nicolas Cage as Eddie
 James Coburn as Mike Donan / Lou Donan
 Peter Fonda as Pete
 Charlie Sheen as Morgan "Fats" Gripp
 Talia Shire as Sam
 Micky Dolenz as Bart
 Ron Taylor as The Baby
 Michael Constantine as Frank

Critical reception
The movie received negative reviews from critics. Kevin Thomas described it as "a hopelessly callow, leaden-paced attempt at film noir."

The film holds a 0% "Rotten" rating on Rotten Tomatoes based on 5 reviews.

Star Michael Biehn called this one of the worst films he ever made.

References

External links

 

1993 films
1990s crime comedy-drama films
Films about con artists
Films about drugs
American crime comedy-drama films
American neo-noir films
Trimark Pictures films
1993 drama films
1990s English-language films
1990s American films